is a Japanese animator, illustrator, character designer, supervisor, director, dōjin artist and a member of the circle . He worked with Akiyuki Shinbo at Shaft. His representative works include key animation for Popotan, and character design for Nurse Witch Komugi, The SoulTaker and Monogatari.

Works

Under the name Akio Watanabe
Anime
 Starship Girl Yamamoto Yohko (character design)
 The SoulTaker (character design)
 Nurse Witch Komugi (character design)
 Magical Canan (character design)
 Hoshizora Kiseki (director, script, character design, storyboard, animation direction, color design)
 Monogatari (chief animation director, character design)
 The World God Only Knows  (character design)
 Pretty Rhythm: Aurora Dream (original character design)
 Etotama (original character design)
 Zaregoto (character design)
 Fireworks (character design)
 Higurashi When They Cry - Gou and Sotsu (character design)
 Rumble Garanndoll (original character design)

Computer games
 Zutto Issho (animation director, character design)
 L no Kisetsu
 Missing Blue
 Grisaia no Kajitsu (character design)

Others
 Hoshiiro Drop (cover art)
22/7 (original character design for Yuki Tojo)
PeroPero☆Teacher (Director, Character Design)

Under the name Poyoyon♥Rock
 Anime
 Djibril – The Devil Angel (episode 2 opening movie)
 Netrun-mon
 Popotan (character design)

 Computer games
 Let's Fish! Hooked On
 Court no Naka no Tenshi-tachi
 Popotan
 To Heart 2 (opening movie)
 Queen's Blade: Spiral Chaos (character design; for some characters)
 Queen's Gate: Spiral Chaos (character design; for some characters)
 Akiba's Trip: Undead & Undressed (character design)

 Trading Card Games
 Aquarian Age

 Others
 Saitama O157 prevention campaign poster
 "Moe Loan" Ron-tan (Livedoor Credit)
 "Akiba Kei SNS 'Filn Mascot characters Fil and Fal

References

External links
 
 Poyoyon♥Rock on Pixiv
 Sukumizu Pettan 
 

Anime character designers
Japanese animators
Japanese animated film directors
Living people
1969 births